Neil Clarke or Clark may refer to:

Neil Clarke (soccer), Scottish-American soccer player
Neil Clarke (editor) (born 1966), American editor
Neil Clarke (Australian footballer) (1957–2003), Australian rules footballer
Neil Clark (musician) (born 1958), British guitarist
Neil Clark (rugby union) (born 1981), English rugby union player

See also 
Neil Clark Warren (born 1934), American clinical psychologist, theologian and professor